Alexander S. MacMillan (October 31, 1870 – August 7, 1955) was a Nova Scotia politician and businessman, the 13th premier of Nova Scotia, from 1940 to 1945.

MacMillan was born in Upper South River in Antigonish County. He made his fortune in lumbering and construction before being made chairman of the Nova Scotia Highways Board in 1920 and serving briefly as minister of highways in 1925. He was a member of Nova Scotia's appointed upper house, the Legislative Council from 1925 until 1928 when he won a seat in the Nova Scotia House of Assembly as a Liberal. He again became minister of highways in 1933. In 1940, when Premier Angus L. Macdonald went to Ottawa to serve in the wartime cabinet of William Lyon Mackenzie King, MacMillan became premier in his place. He retired as premier and from politics in 1945 to allow Macdonald to resume his provincial career. MacMillan died in Halifax at the age of 83.

References 

1870 births
1955 deaths
Nova Scotia Liberal Party MLAs
Premiers of Nova Scotia
Nova Scotia Liberal Party MLCs
People from Antigonish County, Nova Scotia
Canadian people of Scottish descent
Nova Scotia political party leaders